Edin Prljača (born 26 April 1971) is a Bosnian professional football manager and former football goalkeeper. He was most recently the sporting director of Bosnian Premier League club Čelik Zenica.

References

External links
Edin Prljača at Soccerpunter

1971 births
Living people
Footballers from Sarajevo
Bosnia and Herzegovina footballers
FK Sarajevo players
Association football goalkeepers
Bosnia and Herzegovina football managers
Premier League of Bosnia and Herzegovina managers
FK Igman Konjic managers
FK Sarajevo managers
FK Olimpik managers
NK Travnik managers
NK Čelik Zenica managers
Bosnia and Herzegovina expatriate football managers
Expatriate football managers in Ghana
Association football goalkeeping coaches
Bosnia and Herzegovina expatriate sportspeople in Ghana